Rural West York is one of the outer wards of the unitary authority of City of York, England.

The ward is situated to the west of the city and includes the villages of
Askham Bryan, Askham Richard, Hessay, Knapton, Nether Poppleton, Rufforth, Skelton and Upper Poppleton.

Governance

As of the 2019 elections it is represented by Councillors James Barker and Anne Hook who are both members of the local Liberal Democrats. It is a part of the UK Parliamentary Constituency of York Outer. Until January 2020 it also fell within the boundaries of the Yorkshire and the Humber European Parliament constituency.

References

Villages and areas in the City of York
Wards of North Yorkshire